Dargeçit is a town and seat of the Dargeçit District of Mardin Province in Turkey. The town is principally populated by Kurds of the Erebiyan tribe and had a population of 14,976 in 2021.

Neighborhoods 
The town is divided into the four neighborhoods of Bahçebaşı, Safa, Saray and Tepebaşı.

History 
In the nineteenth century, all the urban sttlements in this zone, including Midyat and Kerboran, as well as Mardin and a lot of villages around them and in the Tur Abdin area were populated by Assyrians.

References 

Tur Abdin
Assyrian communities in Turkey
Populated places in Mardin Province
Kurdish settlements in Turkey